Eanbert of Lindisfarne (died 854) was Bishop of Lindisfarne from 845 until 854.  He was the penultimate bishop to reside at Lindisfarne, which by this time was regularly being invaded by Vikings.

Citations

References

854 deaths
Bishops of Lindisfarne
9th-century English bishops
Year of birth unknown